Burgersdorp Hospital is a Provincial government funded hospital for the Walter Sisulu Local Municipality area in Burgersdorp, Eastern Cape in South Africa.

The hospital departments include Emergency department, Maternity ward, Out Patients Department, Surgical Services, Medical Services, Operating Theatre & CSSD Services, Pharmacy, Anti-Retroviral (ARV) treatment for HIV/AIDS, Post Trauma Counseling Services, X-ray Services, Physiotherapy, Oral Health Care Provides, Laundry Services, Kitchen Services and Mortuary.

References
Eastern Cape Department of Health website - Joe Gqabi District Hospitals

Hospitals in the Eastern Cape
Joe Gqabi District Municipality